Únice is a municipality and village in Strakonice District in the South Bohemian Region of the Czech Republic. It has about 60 inhabitants.

Administrative parts
The village of Hubenov is an administrative part of Únice.

References

Villages in Strakonice District